Jeremie Harris is an American actor. He is primarily known for his portrayal of Ptonomy Wallace in FX's Legion.

Biography
Jeremie Harris grew up in New Rochelle where he had ambitions to become a basketball player. He gave up on this dream when he "didn’t become 6’6″ and have a 40-inch vertical". He interned at Def Jam Recordings where he earned his living by putting up posters. He was caught by police when he began sniping other posters. He was let go with a warning and quit due to the music industries' "cutthroat business". He decided to try acting while learning business at New York University and came close to earning a role in the movie Sky High. Following some acting roles at NYU, he dropped out and attended Juilliard instead. His mother, an immigrant from Dominica, did not approve of his decision, but thirty minutes later changed her mind. He has since appeared in major projects such as A Walk Among the Tombstones, Blue Bloods and The Get Down. Jeremie was cast as Ptonomy Wallace in FX's Legion.

Filmography

References

External links
 

Living people
Male actors from New Rochelle, New York
Juilliard School alumni
African-American male actors
American male television actors
Year of birth missing (living people)
21st-century African-American people